Apolychrosis ferruginus is a species of moth of the family Tortricidae. It is found in Tlaxcala, Mexico.

References

Moths described in 1986
Euliini
Moths of Central America